Wang Luoyong (born 24 December 1958) is a Chinese actor who has appeared in American films. He first appeared in Dragon: The Bruce Lee Story as Ip Man. He had recently appeared in CCTV's The Legend of Bruce Lee as Shao Ruhai, a master of Hung Ga and the first to train Bruce Lee (played by Danny Chan). His character "Shao Ruhai" is partially based on James Yimm Lee. He is also the first Chinese Broadway singer.

Early life and education 
Wang was born in Luoyang, Henan, on 24 December 1958, where his parents came to for participating in the construction of key projects. The art enlightenment teacher was his uncle, who taught Wang to play the flute. In 1971, he forced to take part in the Down to the Countryside Movement, and he was admitted to the Shiyan Peking Opera Troupe. In the troupe, due to he liked the sound of the French horn in Taking Tiger Mountain by Strategy, he asked to learn to play it, and he was arranged to study in Hubei Song and Dance Troupe. During that time, he was admitted to Wuhan Conservatory of Music and learned to play the French horn, compose music and other skills. Later, he was accepted to Shanghai Theatre Academy.

After graduating in 1986, Wang pursued advanced studies in the United States. He applied to study at Louisiana State University, but was not accepted because of his poor English. For living expenses, he had to do odd jobs to earn money, washing dishes, delivering takeout, weeding, etc. Later, he was admitted to the Department of Drama and Performance, Boston University, earning a master's degree in 1989. After university, he was recruited by the University of Wisconsin–Milwaukee.

Acting career 
Wang became widely known to audiences with Miss Saigon (1992). 

Since 1993, he played a number of minor roles in various television series including Dragon: The Bruce Lee Story (1993), Vanishing Son III (1994), Daylight (1996), Rollerball (2002), Avatar (2004), and Smile (2006).

Wang returned to China in 2001.

In 2003, Wang appeared in Tracks In The Snow Forest, based on Qu Bo's novel of the same name, as Yang Zirong.

Wang starred as Guo Jing in the 2006 wuxia television series The Return of the Condor Heroes, adapted from Hong Kong novelist Jin Yong's novel of the same title.

In 2008, he was cast as Shao Ruhai in The Legend of Bruce Lee, in which Danny Chan Kwok-kwan played Bruce Lee. 

Wang portrayed Li Bai in the historical television series The Legend of Yang Guifei (2009).

In 2016, Wang's big break came when Zhang Yongxin cast him in the historical war television series The Advisors Alliance, in which he played Zhuge Liang, a role which brought him much publicity.

Wang appeared in My People, My Country, a seven-part anthology drama film released in 2019 to commemorate the 70th anniversary of the establishment of the People's Republic of China.

Filmography

Film

Television

Drama

Variety show

References

External links
Luoyong Wang Biography (1958–)

HKMDB entry

1958 births
Living people
American people of Chinese descent
Chinese male stage actors
Male actors from Luoyang
Wuhan Conservatory of Music alumni
Shanghai Theatre Academy alumni
Boston University alumni
Chinese male film actors
Chinese male television actors